Joseph Audley Pierce (August 31, 1874 – June 23, 1956) was an American football coach.  He was the first head football coach at the University of Tennessee, serving from 1899 to 1900 and compiling a record of 9–4–1.  Pierce was an alumnus of Lafayette College. During the 1920s, Pierce coached at Corsicana High School in Corsicana, Texas.

Pierce died in 1956 and was buried in Homewood Cemetery in Pittsburgh, Pennsylvania.

Head coaching record

References

External links
 

1874 births
1956 deaths
People from Jefferson Hills, Pennsylvania
Tennessee Volunteers football coaches
High school football coaches in Texas
Lafayette College alumni
University of Tennessee College of Law alumni
Burials at Homewood Cemetery